Funtaine Hunter (born December 27, 1983) is a former professional American football and Canadian football linebacker.

Hunter played college football for the Vanderbilt Commodores football team and signed as an undrafted free agent with the Cleveland Browns in May 2007 but waived days later. He signed on to the Calgary Stampeders practice roster for the 2008 CFL season and played three games for the Stampeders that year before being released.

References

Living people
1983 births
Players of American football from Georgia (U.S. state)
American players of Canadian football
Vanderbilt Commodores football players
Calgary Stampeders players